Farringdon Road is a road in Clerkenwell, London.

Route 
Farringdon Road is part of the A201 route connecting King's Cross to Elephant and Castle. It goes southeast from King's Cross, crossing Rosebery Avenue, then turns south, crossing Clerkenwell Road before going past Farringdon station. It finishes on the border between the City of London, the London Borough of Camden and the London Borough of Islington, at a junction with Charterhouse Street. Its line continues into the City as Farringdon Street.

History 
The road's construction, taking almost 20 years between the 1840s and the 1860s, is considered one of the greatest urban engineering achievements of the 19th century. It was one of the first engineered multi-lane roads, and buried the River Fleet in a system of tunnels, solving one of London's most significant sanitary problems. Its construction also included the building of the world's first stretch of underground railway, the Metropolitan Railway that later became part of the London Underground running beneath Farringdon Road from  into the City at  station.

The construction of Farringdon Road necessitated the removal of the Fleet Market that had been built in 1736 above the course of the River Fleet, which is now London's largest subterranean river. North of the market was Hockley-in-the-Hole (around Ray Street Bridge), an area notorious for bear-baiting and similar activities.

Properties
Amongst the notable buildings on Farringdon Road are the former headquarters of The Guardian newspaper at Nos. 119-141, the so-called Zeppelin Building at No. 61 built in 1917 after a Zeppelin raid during World War I, and the western side of Smithfield Market.

A notorious building on Farringdon Road was the Farringdon Road Buildings, a five-tenement block of dwellings built for the working classes during the Victorian era. Lacking bathrooms and with poor sanitary conditions this building, one of the last slum dwellings to exist in central London, was still occupied until the early 1970s. Common features were poor lighting, overcrowding, with rat- and cockroach-infested living conditions, and people trapped by their own poverty. The residents were re-housed by Islington Borough Council and the buildings, close to Exmouth Market and the Royal Mail Mount Pleasant Sorting Office, were pulled down in the mid-1970s to be replaced by a multi-storey car park. A contemporary description of the buildings is given in George Gissing's novel The Nether World.

The dwellings in Faringdon Road had an annex at the bottom of Safron Hill have been restored and now belong to the De Beers Diamond Group. The original set of dwellings were occupied predominantly by Italians and formed part of "Little Italy"

See also

 Hockley-in-the-Hole

References 

Streets in the London Borough of Camden
Streets in the London Borough of Islington
Clerkenwell